"My Brother Jake" is a song and single by English band, Free. Written by lead singer Paul Rodgers and bass guitarist Andy Fraser, it was first released in the UK in 1971.

Background and chart success
The song was the second chart success for Free, reaching number four in the UK Singles Chart in 1971 and remaining in the chart for 11 weeks. It was described by Dave Thompson of AllMusic as a "gorgeous knockabout" of a song.

The band performed the song on BBC's Top of the Pops on 13 May 1971.

In 1991 Andy Fraser revealed that he had originally written the song about Horace Faith, saying: "It was written about a friend, a guy called Horace Faith. He was a great singer and around that time we were great friends. It was basically a sentiment to him, but I thought 'My Brother Jake' sounded better than 'My Brother Horace'."

The song appears on the band's 1973 compilation album The Free Story.

References 

1971 songs
1971 singles
Free (band) songs
Island Records singles
Songs written by Paul Rodgers
Songs written by Andy Fraser